Hiren Kumar Das is an Asom Gana Parishad politician from Assam. He has been elected in Assam Legislative Assembly election in 1996 and 2006 from Mangaldoi constituency.

References 

Living people
Asom Gana Parishad politicians
Assam MLAs 1996–2001
Assam MLAs 2006–2011
Year of birth missing (living people)